United Nations Angola Verification Mission (UNAVEM) was the name of three UN peacekeeping missions in Angola between 1988 and 1997.

 UNAVEM I
 UNAVEM II
 UNAVEM III